Ruth Marie Christelle Gbagbi (born 7 February 1994 in Abidjan) is an Ivorian taekwondo practitioner. She competed in the 67 kg event at the 2012 Summer Olympics; she was defeated by Hwang Kyung-Seon in the preliminary round and eliminated by Helena Fromm in the repechage contest. In the 2016 Summer Olympics, she defeated Farida Azizova to win the bronze medal. She was part of an Ivorian team that included Cheick Sallah Cissé who also won a medal and Mamina Koné. Gbagbi returned in  the 2020 Summer Olympics, winning another bronze.

References

External links

1994 births
Living people
Ivorian female taekwondo practitioners
Sportspeople from Abidjan
Olympic bronze medalists for Ivory Coast
Olympic taekwondo practitioners of Ivory Coast
Taekwondo practitioners at the 2010 Summer Youth Olympics
Taekwondo practitioners at the 2012 Summer Olympics
Taekwondo practitioners at the 2016 Summer Olympics
Taekwondo practitioners at the 2020 Summer Olympics
Medalists at the 2016 Summer Olympics
Medalists at the 2020 Summer Olympics
Universiade medalists in taekwondo
Universiade medalists for Ivory Coast
Competitors at the 2019 African Games
World Taekwondo Championships medalists
African Games medalists in taekwondo
African Games gold medalists for Ivory Coast
African Games bronze medalists for Ivory Coast
Olympic medalists in taekwondo
African Taekwondo Championships medalists
Medalists at the 2015 Summer Universiade
21st-century Ivorian women